Follow the Legion (Spanish: ¡A mí la legión!) is a 1942 Spanish drama film directed by Juan de Orduña and starring Alfredo Mayo, Luis Peña and Manuel Luna.

Plot 
Set in North Africa and in the Legion, it shows the friendship between soldiers, which leads 'El Grajo' to investigate a murder to exonerate a comrade-in-arms and friend. Exaltation of a model soldier of the time in Spain and of the so-called 'military values'.

Sign 
The film poster was made by José Peris Aragó in a 105.5 x 72 cm format. In it, you can see El Grajo and Mauro (of whom only his head is shown) dressed in military dress shown in the background with the Spanish flags waving.

Reception 
A critic from Fotogramas magazine commented on her that "she is the mythical legionnaire that had so much prestige during the Franco regime and that some nostalgics continue to yearn for."

Cast
Alfredo Mayo as Jackdaw 
Luis Peña as Mauro  
Manuel Luna as commander
Miguel Pozanco as worker 
Pilar Soler as Leda  
Manuel Arbó as Ionescu  
Rufino Inglés as Captain Romero  
Fortunato Bernal as Rodete  
 as Samual  
Fred Galiana as legionary Rodriguez
Miguel Pastor as	legionary in a trench
José Sanchiz as Lieutenant in a bar

References

External links

1942 drama films
Spanish drama films
Films directed by Juan de Orduña
Cifesa films
Films scored by Juan Quintero Muñoz
Spanish black-and-white films
1940s Spanish-language films
1940s Spanish films